Astylus aulicus is a species of soft-winged flower beetle in the family Melyridae, found in Central and South America.

References

External links

 

Melyridae